Vera, the Medium is a 1917 American silent drama film directed by G. M. Anderson and starring Kitty Gordon. It was produced by Gordon and Lewis J. Selznick who released through his Select Pictures. The film is considered lost.

Cast
 Kitty Gordon as Vera
 Lowell Sherman as Robert Sterling
 Walter Hitchcock as Herbert Carlton
 Joyce Fair as Carlton's Daughter
 Frank Goldsmith as Albert Hastings
 Grace Blow as Carlton's Wife
 Harris Gordon as Carlton's Son

References

External links
 Vera, the Medium at IMDb.com

lobby poster; Motion Picture World

1917 films
American silent feature films
Lost American films
Films directed by Broncho Billy Anderson
Films based on American novels
American black-and-white films
Silent American drama films
1917 drama films
Selznick Pictures films
Films shot in Fort Lee, New Jersey
1917 lost films
Lost drama films
1910s American films